Hong Kong competed at the 2022 Winter Olympics in Beijing, China, from 4 to 20 February 2022.

Hong Kong's team will consist of three athletes (two men and one woman) competing in two sports. This will be the largest ever team Hong Kong has sent to the Winter Olympics.

Sidney Chu was the country's flagbearer during the opening ceremony. Meanwhile a volunteer was the flagbearer during the closing ceremony.

Competitors
The following is the list of number of competitors participating at the Games per sport/discipline.

Alpine skiing

By meeting the basic qualification standards Hong Kong qualified one male and one female alpine skier.

Audrey King who had previously represented Hong Kong during the 2020 Winter Youth Olympic Games and Adrian Yung both met the minimum standard requirements.

Short track speed skating

Hong Kong has qualified one male short track speed skater.

As Sui Xin who originally obtained the quota place has not obtained a HKSAR passport, Sidney Chu will represent Hong Kong during the 500m short track speed skating event in his place.

See also
Tropical nations at the Winter Olympics

References

Nations at the 2022 Winter Olympics
2022
Winter Olympics